KIPP San Jose Collegiate is a high school in San Jose, California, part of the KIPP chain. It is in the East Side Union High School District and was founded in 2008.

KIPP San Jose Collegiate opened in August 2008. It was founded by Melissa Gonzales, who had been one of the original teachers at KIPP Heartwood Academy, a middle school also in East San Jose. As of the 2016–2017 school year, there were 499 students, of whom 75% were Latino, 22% were Asian/Pacific Islander, and 1% were African American. In the 2015–16 school year, 81% were socio-economically disadvantaged and 7.9% were English learners.

The school has achieved high passing percentages on state proficiency tests,  including in 2015, when many other charter schools' performance on the tests declined. In 2015 it appeared in the top 2% in a Washington Post ranking of high schools by willingness to challenge students by administering upper-level tests.  In 2017 it was ranked 23rd in the US by U.S. News & World Report.

KIPP San Jose Collegiate's sports teams are the Wolfpack.

References

External links
 Official website at KIPP Bay Area
 Official page at East Side Union High School District

High schools in San Jose, California
Charter high schools in California
Educational institutions established in 2008
2008 establishments in California